Sam Guobadia is a Nigerian professor of economics and educational administrator. He is the sixth substantive Vice Chancellor of Benson Idahosa University.

Education
He holds Bachelors and Masters degrees in Economics at State University of New York. In 1989, Sam completed his doctorate degree at the University of Benin, Benin city, Edo State, Nigeria.

Career
He was the Deputy Vice Chancellor at Benson Idahosa University. In 2019, he was appointed as the Vice Chancellor of Benson Idahosa University.

See also
List of Vice-Chancellors of Nigerian universities

References

People from Edo State
Living people
Vice-Chancellors of Nigerian universities
People from Edo State by occupation
People from Benin City
Year of birth missing (living people)